Phenacogrammus taeniatus is a species of fish in the African tetra family. It is known only from the Sangha River in Cameroon.

References

Alestidae
Freshwater fish of Africa
Taxa named by Jacques Géry
Fish described in 1996